Lego City 4D - Officer in Pursuit is a 4-D animated short film attraction based on Lego City. It was released in Legoland California on 12 April 2019 and then rolled out to other Legoland parks and Legoland Discovery Centres in 2019. The film has a runtime of 12 minutes and uses a variety of sensory effects to enhance the experience. The plot focuses on the Lego City police as they pursue a robber in a high-speed chase through the streets of the city. The film was produced by Pure Imagination Studios and distributed by The Lego Group.

Plot 
The story is a high-speed chase that follows a Lego City police officer as he pursues a criminal through the streets and skyscrapers of the city. There are many twists and turns along the way that involve the officer getting wet, flying and getting "bubbled", which are enhanced by sensory 4D effects.

Cast 

 Jonathan Alberto as Police Man
 Michael R. Johnson as Crook
 Paige Mount as Police Woman

4D effects 
Viewers are provided with 3D glasses to experience the visual effects. The film is designed to be an immersive experience and incorporates 4D sensory effects during its 12-minute run time. These include water, wind, fire, fog, bubbles and special lighting effects.

Production 
Lego City 4D – Officer in Pursuit was produced by Pure Imagination Studios and The Lego Group. The story was written by Michael D. Black, who also directed.

Distribution 
Lego City 4D – Officer in Pursuit was released in Legoland California Resort on 12 April 2019 and then rolled out to other Legoland Parks and Legoland Discovery Centres in 2019. It is currently located in all Legoland parks and Legoland Discovery Centres and is available at scheduled times alongside other short films, including The Lego Movie: 4D – A New Adventure and Lego Ninjago: Master of the 4th Dimension.

See also 

 The Lego Movie: 4D – A New Adventure
 Lego Ninjago: Master of the 4th Dimension
 List of Lego films and TV series

References

External links 

 LEGO® City 4D - Officer in Pursuit at Legoland Windsor Resort

Legoland
Amusement park films
4D films
Amusement rides introduced in 2019